Paul A. Schmid III has served in the Massachusetts House of Representatives from the 8th Bristol district since 2011. In the 189th session (2015–2016), he assumed a leadership position as the Chairperson, Joint Committee on Environment, Natural Resources and Agriculture, a committee he joined in 2011.

He was previously a member of the board of selectmen in the town of Westport from 2009 to 2011. Prior to that, he served on the finance committee for five years, serving as chair for three years.

His family operates River Rock Farm in South Westport, which raises grass-fed Angus beef cattle. The farm has been certified organic for four years.

He served in the U.S. Marine Corps with the rank of sergeant.

See also
 2019–2020 Massachusetts legislature
 2021–2022 Massachusetts legislature

References

Democratic Party members of the Massachusetts House of Representatives
People from Westport, Massachusetts
Harvard Business School alumni
Living people
21st-century American politicians
Harvard College alumni
1943 births